The Journal of Criminal Justice (abbreviated J. Crim Justice, or JCJ) is a bimonthly peer-reviewed academic journal covering criminal justice. It was established in 1973 and is published by Elsevier. The editor-in-chief is Matthew DeLisi (Iowa State University). According to the Journal Citation Reports, the journal has a 2017 impact factor of 3.973. The journal has been criticized for frequently publishing articles that cite other articles in the same journal.

References

External links

Elsevier academic journals
Criminology journals
Publications established in 1973
Bimonthly journals
English-language journals